Solemoviridae is a family of non-enveloped, positive-strand RNA viruses which infect plants. Solemoviridae is a member of the order Sobelivirales.

Structure 
Member viruses are non-enveloped and have a viral capsid with T=3 symmetry.

Genome 

Solemoviruses have a positive-sense, single-strand RNA genome. The length of the genome is 4652 bp. The 3' terminus does not have a polyA-tail. The 5' terminus has a genome-linked viral protein (VPg).

Taxonomy 
The family contains four genera and seven species unassigned to a genus:

Genera:

Enamovirus
Polemovirus
Polerovirus
Sobemovirus

Species unassigned to a genus:

Barley yellow dwarf virus GPV
Barley yellow dwarf virus SGV
Chickpea stunt disease associated virus
Groundnut rosette assistor virus
Indonesian soybean dwarf virus
Sweet potato leaf speckling virus
Tobacco necrotic dwarf virus

References

Sobemoviruses
Virus families